William Martin Richards (born March 31, 1873) was an American college football player and coach. He served as the head football coach at Oberlin College in 1895 and Bowdoin College in 1898.

References

1873 births
Year of death missing
Bowdoin Polar Bears football coaches
Oberlin Yeomen football coaches
Yale Bulldogs football players
Players of American football from New Haven, Connecticut
Sportspeople from New Haven, Connecticut